Glooko, Inc provides a Software-as-a-Service (SaaS) application and accompanying mobile app for diabetes patients and their healthcare providers in the United States and internationally.

An mHealth, Telemedicine and Population Management offering, Glooko is a HIPAA-compliant unified diabetes management platform that is used by both patients and their Health Care Providers (HCP).  Accountable Care Organizations and Integrated Health Systems seeking to remotely monitor patient health to improve patient outcomes and reduce the costs of delivery, hospitalizations and emergency room visits have started to use telemedicine applications for patient remote monitoring to enable early warning and proactive action for issues related to chronic diseases like diabetes and hypertension.

Glooko consists of a patient mobile app, a provider population management app accessed online and a meter sync hardware device which delivers insights and population management features and enables patients to upload data from their blood glucose meters. Glooko currently supports syncing data from more than 30 blood glucose meters using a proprietary meter sync cable called the MeterSync Blue. Patients can check their blood glucose meter for compatibility on the website.

Capabilities

Glooko offers a unified diabetes management platform which brings together diabetes data (blood glucose levels, diet, fitness, biometrics, insulin and medication data) for patients and their healthcare providers. Patients access charts and graphs of their blood glucose levels and can maintain a digital logbook of diet, fitness, biometric, insulin and medication data via the Glooko mobile app that can be downloaded from the Apple App Store and from the Google Play App Store for iOS and Android respectively
.  Healthcare providers access the Glooko Population Management web application to track patient and population level data. Providers can track issues over-time and are alerted to patients with issues. During the COVID-19 pandemic, Glooko offered a free tool to people with diabetes and healthcare providers to enable safe and connected patient care.

History

Glooko was founded in 2011 by Internet Pioneer Yogen Dalal, Sundeep Madra, and Chamath Palihapitiya. Each founder had been impacted by diabetes in a personal way and wanted to develop an offering that could leverage the power of the Internet, mobile connectivity and big data analytics to deliver applications to improve diabetes management.

Company information
Glooko is a privately held company. Its headquarters are in Mountain View, California. As of June 2017, the company has received $71 million in funding with the most recent round being Series C. Investors include a variety of angel investors, including Judy Estrin, The Social+Capital Partnership, Canaan Partners, Samsung and Medtronic.

See also 
 Blood glucose monitoring
 Diabetes management software

References

External links 
 

Software companies based in the San Francisco Bay Area
Companies based in Palo Alto, California
Software companies of the United States
2011 establishments in the United States
2011 establishments in California
Software companies established in 2011
Companies established in 2011